The badminton women's team tournament at the 2015 Southeast Asian Games in Singapore was held from 10 June to 12 June at the Singapore Indoor Stadium.

Schedule
All times are Singapore Standard Time (UTC+08:00)

Results

Quarter-final

Semi-final

Final

References

External links
seagames2015.com

Badminton at the 2015 Southeast Asian Games
Women's sports competitions in Singapore
South